Vadzim is a Belarusian masculine given name derived either from the Persian badian (anise or aniseed), or from the Belarusian word valodać, meaning to rule or ancient Russian vaditi, meaning to blame. Its long version, Vadzimir, is now obsolete. 

It may refer to:

Vadzim Bojka (born 1978), Belarusian footballer
Vadzim Dziemidovič (born 1985), Belarusian footballer
Vadzim Lasoŭski (born 1975), Belarusian retired footballer
Vadzim Machnieŭ (born 1979), Belarusian canoer
Vadzim Mazanik, Belarusian welterweight champion in men's Thai-Boxing at the W.A.K.O. European Championships 2004 (Budva)
Vadzim Mytnik (born 1988), Belarusian footballer
 Vadzim Jerčyk (born 1991), Belarusian footballer

References